{
  "type": "ExternalData",
  "service": "geoshape",
  "properties": {
    "stroke": "#ff0000",
    "stroke-width": 1
  },
  "query": "# Gram Panchayats in Kerala\nSELECT ?id ?idLabel\n(concat('', ?idLabel, '') as ?title)\nWHERE\n{\n?id wdt:P31 wd:Q2732840. # is a district\n?id wdt:P131* wd:Q1186. # in Kerala\nSERVICE wikibase:label { bd:serviceParam wikibase:language 'en'}\n}"}
Kerala is a state on the southwestern coast of India. Kerala, with appreciative development indicators comparable to developed countries, has been experimenting with decentralization and participatory local democracy, ultimately aimed at realization of the constitutional goal of establishing genuine "institutions of local self government" since the enactment of Kerala Panchayat Raj Act & The Kerala Municipality Act in the year 1994.

District Wise Data 
Kerala has 941 Village Panchayats (Grama panchayats), 152 Block Panchayats and 14 District Panchayats; in the urban areas, it has 87 Municipalities and 6 Corporations, a total of 1200 Local Self Government Institutions. The list of number of local government institutions from the period 1995-2015 is given below:

The President of the Panchayat Raj Institutions(PRIs) has been declared as the executive authority. The senior most officials of various departments brought under the control of the Panchayat Raj Institutions have been declared as ex-officio Secretaries for that subject. The Panchayats have full administrative control including powers of disciplinary action over its own staff as well as staff transferred to it. To encourage a healthy relationship between officials and elected Members, the Act prescribes a code of conduct that lays down principles of polite behavior, respect for elected authorities, and protection of the freedom of the civil servant to render advice freely and fearlessly. All these features are there in the Kerala Municipality Act as well.

The Kerala Panchayat Raj Act and Kerala Municipalities Act 1994 were thoroughly restructured in 1999 and several innovative features laying strong legal foundation for evolving genuine institutions of Local Self Government were built in. The list of various local self governments in the state of Kerala are given below:

Grama Sabha

Kerala has created a three-tier in the form of Grama Sabhas equated with the electoral constituency of a Village Panchayat All the electors of the Ward are members of the Grama Sabha. It is an attempt to create a new set up for direct democracy – involving the people of the ward. The Grama Sabhas have been given clear rights and responsibilities with absolute powers for identification of beneficiaries, strong advisory powers for prioritizing developmental needs and wide powers of social audit.

Functions of local governments
The 11th Schedule of the Constitution of India lists out developmental areas where local governments should have a role in planning for economic development and social justice and in the implementation of such plans. Unlike many other States, Kerala State defined the functional areas of the different tiers of local governments so precisely. In infrastructure and management of public institutions, the functional differentiation is sharp and clear, but in productive sectors the functions could not be earmarked clearly for each tier. There is a clear recognition that there is a role-range for local governments as Agent, Adviser, Manager, Partner and Actor – with the objective being to reduce the agency role and expand the autonomous – actor role. The Kerala Act classifies functions as mandatory functions, general functions and sector-wise functions. in its schedules.

According to a study Dr Martin Patrick (Chief Economist) CPPR, "Gram panchayats are performing better when compared to their performance three decades earlier but they are still not meeting expected standards in generating own funds with which they can plan their own special projects, s Steps need to be taken to generate own assets by collecting more non-tax revenue, particularly collecting potential building and professional tax"

Committee System
All Village and Block Panchayats have three Standing Committees and the District Panchayat five Standing Committees. The Standing Committees are constituted in such a way that every Member of the Panchayat gets a chance to function in one Standing Committee or the other. Each Standing Committee is assigned certain subjects and these Committees are expected to go into the subject areas both at the planning and implementation stage in great detail.
For the purpose of co-ordination, a steering committee is constituted consisting of the President and Vice President of the Panchayat and the Chairpersons of Standing Committees. In addition, there are Functional Committees for different subjects which can include experts and practitioners and the Panchayats are free to constitute Sub Committees to assist the Standing Committee or Functional Committee. There is also provision for constitution of Joint Committees with neighbouring Local Governments.

The Role of State Government
The amended Kerala Panchayat Raj & Municipality Acts drastically reduces the powers of direct governmental control over Panchayat Raj Institutions. While Government can issue general guidelines regarding national and State policies it cannot meddle in day-to-day affairs or individual decisions. The Government can cancel resolutions of the Panchayat only through a process and in consultation with the Ombudsman or Appellate Tribunal according to the subject matter of the resolution. Similarly a Panchayat can be dissolved directly by government, only if it fails to pass the budget or if majority of its members have resigned. In all other cases a due process has to be followed and the Ombudsman has to be consulted before dissolution takes place. This is a unique feature which does not exist even in Center-State relations.

Independent Oversight Institutions
To reduce governmental control and foster growth of self-government as envisaged in the Constitution, the Act provides for creation of independent institutions to deal with various aspects of local government functioning. They are listed below:-
 The State Election Commission. The Election Commission has been given powers which go beyond those required for the conduct of elections. It is empowered to involve in delimitation of Wards as a member of the Delimiation Committee. Delimitation of wards was formerly done through the executive. The Commission has been given powers to disqualify defectors.
 The State Finance Commission. This has been given the mandate as required by the Constitution. The first SFC was constituted in 1994 and the second SFC in 1999.
 Ombudsman for Local Governments. This is a high power institution which has been given vast powers to check malfeasance in local governments in the discharge of developmental functions.
 Tribunal for Local Governments. These are to be constituted at the Regional/District level to take care of appeals by citizens against decisions of the local government taken in the exercise of their regulatory role like issue of licence, grant of permit etc.
 State Development Council. This is headed by the Chief Minister and consists of the entire Cabinet, Leader of opposition, Vice-Chairman of the State Planning Board,  the Chief Secretary,  all the District Panchayat Presidents who are also Chairperson of District Planning Committee and representatives of other tiers of local governments. This institution is expected to take the lead in policy formulation and in sorting out operation issues.

Extent of Decentralization
The extent of decentralization and its nature can be gauged from the following facts:
 In the Health sector all institutions other than medical colleges and big regional speciality hospitals have been placed under the control of the local governments.
 In the Education sector, in rural areas the high schools and upper primary schools have been transferred to the District Panchayats and the primary schools have been transferred to village Panchayats; in urban areas, all schools have been transferred to the urban local governments.
 The entire responsibility of poverty alleviation has gone to the local governments; all the centrally sponsored anti-poverty programmes are planned and implemented through them.
 As regards Social welfare, barring statutory functions relating to juvenile justice, the entire functions have gone to local governments. The ICDS is fully implemented by Village Panchayats and Urban Local Governments. Care of the disabled, to a substantial degree has become a local government responsibility.
 In the Agriculture and allied sectors,  the de facto and de jure local government functions are Agricultural extension including farmer oriented support for increasing production and productivity, Watershed management and minor irrigation, Dairy development, Animal Husbandry including veterinary care & Inland fisheries.
 Barring highways and major district roads, connectivity has become local government responsibility.
 The whole of sanitation and most of rural water supply have moved over to local governments.
 Promotion of tiny, cottage and small industries is mostly with the local governments.
 All the welfare pensions are administered by the local governments.

Present scenario
In short, most of the responsibilities relating to human and social development have been passed down to local governments. Welfare and poverty reduction are now largely dependent on local governments who also have considerable area of responsibility in the primary sector.

Local infrastructure creation is also largely in the domain of Panchayats and Nagarapalikas.
Critical institutions of public service like hospitals, schools, anganwadis, veterinary institutions, Krishi Bhawans, hostels for Scheduled Castes and Care institutions for different disadvantaged groups have been transferred to local governments on as is where is condition. The responsibility of local governments which are typical of a non-plan nature in respect of these institutions include -
	routine and heavy maintenance of infrastructure
	upkeep and maintenance of equipment
	replenishment of consumables
	administrative charges relating to telephone, water, electricity, fuel etc.
	noon-meal cost in schools.

Proposed reforms 
The Second Administrative Reforms Commission, set up on 31 August 2005 to prepare a detailed blue print for revamping the public administration system, suggested measures to achieve a proactive, responsive, accountable, sustainable and efficient administration at all levels of the country in the country, including the local government system, submitted its sixth report exclusively on local governance under the title Local Governance: An Inspiring Journey into the future . A brief summary of the report is there in the article

Kerala Grama Panchayat Association
Kerala has a Grama Panchayath Association, formed under the Kerala Government Order No 85191/pt.sppl.1/66 & R D D on 29 December 1966 as an association of Grama Panchayaths. All Grama Panchayaths are affiliated to the Grama Panchayath Association.
The Kerala Grama Panchayath Association has responsibility in strengthening decentralization process and local governance in Kerala. For the purpose, the association organizes necessary research activities, Studies, action Researches, some study models and conduct discussions, seminars, training etc., on issues confronting panchayaths in the state.

E-Governance

E-District 
Kerala E-District project intends to provide Government services to citizens through Common Service Centers(CSC) which are easily accessible. Services from different departments are brought under one umbrella at any CSC. Some of the services are also made available through online portal. It utilizes backend computerization to e-enable the delivery of services and ensures transparency and uniform application of rules. The project involves integrated and seamless delivery of services to public by automation, integration and incorporating Business Process Re-Engineering(BPR) where ever required. In a nutshell E-District is a tailor-made program for minimizing effort and time to provide prompt and effective services to the public.

E-Gram 
Honourable Chief Minister of Kerala Shri. Oommen Chandy has declared Pampakuda panchayat, Ernakulam as the first digital panchayat in Kerala on 28 June 2014. Pampakuda panchayat has achieved this feat by digitalizing over 18,000 citizens' survey data with the help of E-Gram, a software built by a private IT company operating in Technolodge Piravom.

E-Gram is a cloud based platform built exclusively for Gram Panchayats and is a data analytic tool which stores and analyses all information regarding people in a panchayat. E-Gram generates real-time analytics on population, literacy rate, male-female ratio, poverty threshold, internet penetration, access to electricity, access to clean water, healthcare etc. E-Gram's objective is to make panchayats more efficient, transparent and symbols of modernity by leveraging ICT at the cutting edge level to ensure transparency and accountability in their functioning through disclosure of information, social audit, efficient delivery of services and improving internal processes and management of panchayats. E-Gram has built-in SMS functionality which helps interact with people faster. This helps panchayats to roll out benefits, announcements, or even acknowledgement receipts for certificates in Malayalam. This automated SMS service can also send reminder SMSs to citizens who are due to pay their taxes.

References

External links
 Official website of Local Self Government Department, Government of Kerala
 An Introduction to LOCAL SELF GOVERNMENTS IN KERALA

See also
 Administrative reforms in Kerala
 Gram panchayat
 District Planning in Kerala
 Municipalities of Kerala
 NREGS (Kerala)
 Peoples Planning in Kerala
 Ombudsman for Local Governments in Kerala
 State Finance Commission (Kerala)
 Tribunal for Local Governments in Kerala
 Local government in Maharashtra

Local government in Kerala
Kerala